Le Dôme de Marseille is an indoor amphitheatre, located in Marseille, France. The capacity of the arena is 8,500 people.

The amphitheatre has hosted concerts by many famous artists, spanning many different genres.

External links

Music venues in France
Amphitheaters
Buildings and structures in Marseille